Steve's Piece was an early Alt Country/Power Pop band in Minneapolis from circa 1992–1995.

The band was heavily influenced by two fellow Minnesota bands The Replacements and The Gear Daddies and their sound was essentially an amalgam of the two.

The band was included in a February 1995 Minneapolis Star and Tribune A List.  Steve's Piece's swan song began just as the band was breaking through, due to Robb Schwartz decision to leave and join fellow Minneapolis alt rockers Box 10.

Live Performances 
Steve's Piece first played a live show on Halloween 1993 at The Ace Box Bar in St. Paul.

The band frequently played several popular venues in the Minneapolis area including the 400 Bar and The Seventh Street Entry.

Party at Jason's 
The band recorded their debut 'Party at Jason's' with Jason Orris at the Terrarium studio's original Minneapolis location in the North Loop on Washington Ave.

Notable Songs 
Steve's Piece was an original band who occasionally included obscure or twisted covers in their sets.

 Since you Went and Broke my Heart
 I Couldn't Offer You Much
 Fame and Misfortune
 Clean & Sober
 In Winona, a tongue-in-cheek double entendre about being a rock star in Minneapolis, having to play in Winona, Minnesota, and dating Winona Ryder.
 Chicken
 Two Fingers
 Wonderful Tonight by Eric Clapton, performed at punk tempo.
 And You Drive Your Pretty Car by The Strawberry Zots.

Later Projects 
The band was partially reformed later as "Plan B".

Arcana formed by Robb Schwartz in 1997 and went on to release multiple albums on hikarate Records 

Ted and Rob reunited to collaborate further in a band called "Mini Bike" and release "Songs about Girls - Vol. 1" in 2003.

Robb Schwartz founded and currently plays in Famous Volcanos

Dying to Make it 
In 2010 Robb Schwartz began work on an original rock opera with John Hile. Early in the project Ted Martin was invited to collaborate and the result was Dying to Make it - A Rock Opera that performed a sold out multi-night run at Minneapolis' Southern Theater.

Musical groups from Minnesota